The Hebron massacre was a massacre of Jews at Hebron that occurred during the 1929 Palestine riots.

Hebron massacre may also refer to:

 1517 Hebron attacks
 Battle of Hebron in 1834
 1929 Hebron massacre
 1980 Hebron attack
 Cave of the Patriarchs massacre in 1994 
 Hebron Massacre, a 1994 album by Muslimgauze